Zdeněk Pazdírek (born 13 December 1953) is a former competitive figure skater who represented Czechoslovakia. He is the 1974–75 national champion and competed at the 1976 Winter Olympics in Innsbruck, placing 12th. He finished in the top ten at five European Championships and two World Championships. Following his competitive career, he toured professionally with Holiday on Ice from 1981–89. He married British figure skater Karena Richardson.

Pazdírek teaches skating at the Coquitlam Skating Club in British Columbia, Canada. He has coached Jordan Ju and Larkyn Austman.

Results

References

 info

1953 births
Figure skaters at the 1976 Winter Olympics
Czechoslovak male single skaters
Olympic figure skaters of Czechoslovakia
Czech figure skating coaches
Czech emigrants to Canada
Canadian figure skating coaches
Living people
Figure skaters from Brno